Persatuan Sepakbola Nunukan (simply known as PSN Nunukan) is an Indonesian football club based in Nunukan Regency, North Kalimantan. They currently compete in the Liga 3. The club is located in the Nunukan Regency which is the Indonesia–Malaysia border and their homeground is the Sungai Bilal Stadium.

References

Football clubs in Indonesia
Football clubs in North Kalimantan